Forssjö is a locality situated in Katrineholm Municipality, Södermanland County, Sweden with 537 inhabitants in 2010.

References 

Populated places in Södermanland County
Populated places in Katrineholm Municipality